Jasper Hanebuth (1607 – February 4, 1653) was a German mercenary in the Thirty Years' War, as well as a robber and murderer.

Life 
Jasper Hanebuth was born on the "Hof Pieper", a rebuilt half-timbered complex which today is listed on Buchholz-Kirchweg 72. He was the son of Hans Hanebuth, a cotter in Groß-Buchholz, and was baptised on February 8 in Groß-Buchholz near Hanover.

Jasper Hanebuth became a mercenary in Swedish service during the Thirty Years' War. Even during the war, he acquired the Hanover citizenship, but soon lost it again as he did not pay his tax debts. Hanebuth was described as a coarse, violent character whose tantrums were feared by those around him. He is considered as an example of the everyday violence and brutality of morals after the end of the Thirty Years' War. His victims included his own "robber bride". He subsequently became a horse dealer until he was reported for a horse theft and arrested on November 14, 1652, eventually confessing to 10 thefts and 19 murders following repeated threats of torture, "meticulous according to the high justice", in the council of the Altes Rathaus, where he admitted his guilt.<ref name="HAZ 19.02.10">Simone Benne:  Hanover 's robber killer Hanebuth and his legendary fame' ', HAZ from 19.</ref> Then, after spending nearly a year in prison, on 3–4 February 1653, he was sentenced "to be judged by the breaking wheel by his limbs from life to death".

On 4 February 1653, Hanebuth was executed in Hanover in front of a stone gate on the breaking wheel.

 Aftermath 
Hanebuth is still present in the consciousness of the Hanoverians:

 For sculptor Peter Köster, who died in 1661, for Jasper Hanebuth's younger brother Hinrich, he created a tombstone that can still be found today at the St. Nicolai church in Bothfeld.Hugo Thielen:  Köster (also Koster, Kuster, Küster), Peter , in:  Stadtlexikon Hannover , p. 361
 However, many legends surrounding the robber can not be confirmed from historical sources; according to legend, he had stretched a string over the forest chapel, which was connected with a small bell, so as to be rung when merchants came by. Nor was his home a robber's den in the Eilenriede. Similarly, it has not been proven that he supported the poor from the nearby village of Groß-Buchholz with his prey.
 A cross that existed at the beginning of the stone gate field from the time before Hanebuth's execution was later incorrectly assigned to the event, but then in 1929 it was given the name White Cross Square on the Lister mile.
 "Hanebuth's gang" on the high bank "is probably the remainder of a passage under the city wall to the leash", which was filled up after a short distance.Foto von Stefan Arend
 At the turn of the 19th century there were still postcards with the motif of "Hanebuth's Block" on the Schiffgraben in front of the former entrance building of the zoo.
 The 1967 street Hanebuthwinkel in Groß-Buchholz on the Eilenriede at Steuerdieb reminds with their naming of the robber.
 Since 1991, the information board "Hof Pieper" in Hanebuth's birthplace reminds of the criminal.
 In front of the birthplace of Jasper Hanebuth, the sculpture "Large pedestal torso XX" was erected, a work of the sculptor Waldemar Otto from the year 1986 and on loan from the Stübler Gallery. An additional sign with the inscription "Jasper Hanebuth's last victim", was attached to the concrete base below the armless sculpture.
 Related to Hanebuth is the 2010 history novel "The Concubine of the murderer" by Bettina Szrama, in which Hanebuth is seen as "a resurrection as a dark novel hero".

See also
 List of German serial killers

 Literature 
 Joachim Lehrmann: Robber gangs between Harz and Weser - Hanover, Braunschweig, Hildesheim - A historical review. Lehrte 2004, S. 64–76.
 August Jugler: The robber-killed Jasper Hanebuth.  A picture of life from the Thirty Years War. After the criminal = files. Hahn'sche bookstore, Hanover 1880, Hannover 1880, p. 35
 Karl Henninger, Johann von Harten, Lower Saxony's Sagenborn. August Lar Verlag, 3. Aufl. 1927, S. 15 ff.
 Helmut Zimmermann: The origin of the robber-killer Jasper Hanebuth. In: Hanover history sheets, Neue Folge 41, 1987, p. 31–38
 Helmut Zimmermann: The origin of the robber-killed Jasper Hanebuth. In: Friedrich-Wilhelm Busse (Hrsg.): Groß-Buchholz. Pictures and stories from days gone by, Pinkenburger circle. Geiger publisher house, Horb am Neckar 1992, S. 28ff.
 Helmut Zimmermann: Hanebuth ... (Jasper and others). In: Hannoversches Biographisches Lexikon, p. 149, 206, 408; partly online: via Google Books
 ders.: Hanebuth, Jasper, in: Stadtlexikon Hannover, S. 252
 Simon Benne: Hanover's robber-killed Hanebuth an his legendary fame. In: Hannoversche Allgemeine Zeitung'', 19 February 2010

References

External links 
 Hanebuth at historical serial killer.de
 Hanebuth, Jasper Hannover-Lexikon
 The robber Hanebuth...the "Robin Hood of Hanover"

1607 births
1653 deaths
17th-century executions in the Holy Roman Empire
Criminals from Lower Saxony
Executed German serial killers
German mercenaries
German robbers
Male serial killers
Military personnel from Hanover
People of the Thirty Years' War